Ambler Heights Historic District is a historic district in Cleveland Heights, Ohio, United States.

References 

Cleveland Heights, Ohio
National Register of Historic Places in Cuyahoga County, Ohio
Historic districts in Cuyahoga County, Ohio
Geography of Cuyahoga County, Ohio
Historic districts on the National Register of Historic Places in Ohio